Kazma Sporting Club is a Kuwaiti professional association football club. Founded in 1964, the club competes in the Kuwaiti Premier League.

Club history

Naming
The club is named after the area of Kathma. In 630 A.D., the battle of 'That Alslasil' took place in Kathma, which is located forty kilometers north of Kuwait City on the coast of Kuwait.

Recent history
On 21 December 2009, under head coach Ilie Balaci, Kazma played a friendly match against reigning La Liga champions FC Barcelona to commemorate the 45th anniversary of the club. The match ended with 1–1 draw and Barcelona received €1.7 million to participate in the match.

Won the Kuwait Emir Cup in 2011 a 1–0 over Kuwait SC.

2011-
On November 10, 2015, after 4 years of trophy-less seasons the club won the 2015-16 Kuwait Federation Cup vs Kuwait SC 2-1 goals scored by Patrick Fabiano.

Stadium

Kazma's stadium, Al-Sadaqua Walsalam Stadium, is a multi-purpose stadium located in Kuwait City, Kuwait. It is currently used mostly for football matches. The stadium has a 21,500 holding capacity. It is the 2nd largest stadium in Kuwait and is the home ground for Kazma.

The stadium hosted 2 Arabian Gulf Cup tournaments, the first being in 1990, which Kuwait won for the seventh time. However, the second time in 2003 Kuwait ended up in 6th place, which is their worst ever ranking. It has also hosted many finals of the Kuwait Emir Cup and Kuwait Crown Cup.

Presidents

 Ahmad Khalid Al-Fozan (Oct 1964 – Oct 1965)
 Yousef Abdullah Mohammed Shaheen Al-Ghanim (Nov 1965 – June 1995)
 Abdullah Al-Dakheel Al-Rasheed (June 1995 – Sep 1995)
 Suleiman Mohamed Saleh Al-Adsani (Sept 1995 – May 1997)
 Khalid Nasser Al-Sanea (May 1997 – May 2000)
 Suleiman Mohamed Saleh Al-Adsani (May 2000 – May 2006)
 Asad Ahmed Al-Banwan (May 2006–)

Achievements
Kazma has 20 official championships.

Official
Viva Premier League: 4
1986, 1987, 1994, 1996

Kuwait Emir Cup: 8
1982, 1984, 1990, 1995, 1997, 1998, 2011, 2022
Kuwait Crown Cup: 1
1995
Runners-up : 2007
Gulf Club Champions Cup: 2
1987, 1995
Runners-up 1988, 1997

Kuwaiti Division One: 1
1968–69

Kuwait Super Cup:
 Runners-up : 2011

Kuwait Federation Cup: 2
 2015–16, 2017–18
 Runners-up : 2009, 2012 
Al Khurafi Cup: 2
2004, 2007

Friendly
Al Hasawi Super Cup: 1
2007

Futsal

Kuwaiti Futsal League: 2
  2014–15, 2015–16

Kuwait Futsal Super Cup: 3
 2015, 2017, 2018

Current squad

Recent seasons

Kazma's biggest wins
 In Asia
1988: Kazma 3–0  Muharraq Club
1989: Kazma 3–0  Sharjah
1995: Kazma 9–0  Dhofar
1996: Kazma 4–1  Al Ain
1999: Kazma 3–0  Al Nassr

 Friendlies
2008: Kazma 7–1  Spartak Trnava
2009: Kazma 1–1  Ismaily
2009: Kazma 1–1  FC Barcelona

Kazma in Asia

FIFA World Cup and AFC Asian Cup Players
FIFA World Cup 1982 

Nassir Al-Ghanim
Jamal Al-Qabendi
Hamoud Al-Shemmari
Yussef Al-Suwayed
Adam Marjam
Abdullah Mayouf

Managerial history

Affiliated clubs
 Boca Juniors

Other sports
Besides football, the club has teams for handball, basketball, volleyball, waterpolo, Squash, athletics, Gymnastics, Swimming, Boxing, Judo, Weightlifting, Taekwando, and  Ice Hockey.

Basketball

FIBA Asia Champions Cup: twice finished third in  Indonesia  1990 in Jakarta and  Thailand  1992 in Bangkok

Handball team achievements

Asian Club League Handball Championship: 2
1998 in  Amman
1999 in  Isfahan

Performance in AFC (Asian) Competitions
 Asian Club Championship: 4 appearances
1987: Group Stage (Top 8)
1988: Group Stage (Top 8)
1995: First Round
1997: Second Round

 Asian Cup Winners Cup: 4 appearances
1991–92: Quarter-Finals
1995–96: Quarter-Finals
1997–98: Second Round
1998–99: Quarter-Finals (withdrew)

AFC Cup: 2 appearances
2010: Quarter-Finals
2012: Round of 16

References

External links
 Official site

 
Kazma
Kazma
Association football clubs established in 1964
1964 establishments in Kuwait
Sports teams in Kuwait